Stone, Steel & Bright Lights is a live album by Jay Farrar, backed by Canyon. It was recorded in September and October 2003, and released in 2004 on Farrar's label Transmit Sound, and distributed by Artemis Records. An accompanying DVD Live at Slim's was recorded at Slim's on January 23, 2004.

Track listing
All tracks written by Jay Farrar, except where noted.

Live at Slim's DVD

Personnel
 Jay Farrar – guitars, harmonica, lead vocals
 Evan Berodt – bass
 Dave Bryson – drums, percussion
 Brandon Butler – guitars, lap steel guitar, maracas
 Derrick DeBorja – keyboards
 Joe Winkle – guitars

References

2004 albums